Santiago Ventura was the defending champion, but lost in the second round.

Mariano Puerta won the title, defeating Juan Mónaco 6–4, 6–1 in the final.

Seeds

  Rainer Schüttler (first round)
  Filippo Volandri (semifinals)
  Luis Horna (first round)
  Fabrice Santoro (first round)
  Florian Mayer (second round)
  Mariano Puerta (champion)
  Gilles Müller (quarterfinals)
  Christophe Rochus (quarterfinals)

Draw

Finals

Top half

Bottom half

External links
 2005 Grand Prix Hassan II Draw
 2005 Grand Prix Hassan II Qualifying Draw

Singles